Jaremi Lee Carey (born Jeremy Lee Carey; October 10, 1985) is an American actor, streamer, singer, cosplay artist, and former drag performer who performed under the name Phi Phi O'Hara. In the O'Hara persona, Carey came to international attention as a runner-up on the 4th season of RuPaul's Drag Race and placing 7th on the second season of RuPaul's Drag Race: All Stars.

Early life 
Carey was born to Rickey Lee Carey and Rhonda Lynn Malott (also said to be Maritza Cortes) on October 10, 1985, in San Antonio, Texas. His parents divorced when he was 17 years old. He is of Filipino and Portuguese descent.

Carey went to school for graphic and web design. He is a certified optician.

Career 
Carey as Phi Phi O'Hara was announced as one of the thirteen contestants for RuPaul's Drag Race season 4 on November 13, 2011. He achieved a runner-up position. In 2012, Carey was invited back as a contestant on All Stars 1, but declined to participate in the competition due to personal reasons. He came back for All Stars 2 in 2016 and initially made it to the top five, but after the return of two previously eliminated contestants, Alyssa Edwards and Tatianna in the fifth episode, he placed seventh overall after being eliminated by them.

He has been featured in the music videos for "Stranger" by Chris Malinchak, "Battle Axe" by Sharon Needles, "Ratchet Christmas" by Jiggly Caliente and "I Call Shade" by RuPaul's Drag Race: All Stars (season 4) winner Trinity the Tuck.

Carey made news headlines across the web with a project called "365 Days of Drag". His original goal was to post one photo in drag every day of 2016 (except for February 29, since it was a leap year). Carey successfully completed all 365 looks, posting the final look on January 1, 2017. The final outfit was a gown made of hundreds of printed photographs that featured all of the looks from the series.

In 2017, Carey organized a drag benefit show to raise funds for the victims of Hurricane Maria in Puerto Rico, which featured other Drag Race alumni. The event took place on November 6, 2017, in Minneapolis and raised over $80,000.

In October 2019, Carey successfully completed another photo series called "31 Days of Wizardry". Each day he transformed himself into a different character from the Harry Potter universe.

As of December 2020, Carey is currently a co-chair of national organization Drag Out the Vote, which works with drag performers to promote voting among the LGBT community.

Music 
Carey has been releasing music as Phi Phi O'Hara since 2014, but he started performing under his real name as well in 2015. His debut album Fever Heart was released on October 14, 2016. He is featured in the first three volumes of the Christmas Queens albums with "O Come, All Ye Faithful" (2017), "Fireside" (2016) and "Naughty or Nice" (2015). In 2018, Carey recorded a duet with Jiggly Caliente for her album T.H.O.T. Process called "Beat of My City".

Streamer 
In 2020, Jaremi joined the Twitch Community as an LGBT+ Gameplayer. There he plays games like Dead by Daylight, Animal Crossing, Pokémon, Sims, Overwatch or Just Chats with his fans. His previous username was ThePocketGay, but in August 2020 he changed his Twitter and Twitch usernames to JustJaremi and tweeted that "There is no more Phi Phi <3".

Personal life 
In 2017, Carey married his longtime boyfriend, Mikhael Ortega.

Filmography

Film

Television

Theatre

Web series

Music videos

Discography

Albums

Singles

As lead artist

As featured artist

References

External links 
 Phi Phi O'Hara discography at Discogs
 Jaremi Carey discography at Discogs

1985 births
Living people
LGBT people from Texas
American LGBT singers
Twitch (service) streamers